Morvin M. Duel (July 8, 1888August 18, 1948) was an American educator, businessman, and Republican politician.  He was the 15th insurance commissioner of the state of Wisconsin, and served four years in the Wisconsin State Senate.

Early life and education
Duel was born on July 8, 1888, in the town of Eldorado, in Fond du Lac County, Wisconsin. He graduated from high school in Rosendale, Wisconsin, and earned his bachelor's degree from the Oshkosh State Teachers College in 1910.

Career
He worked for some time as a teacher before going into the insurance business. He was superintendent of schools of Fond du Lac County from 1915 to 1921.  In 1936, he was elected on the Republican Party ticket to the Wisconsin State Senate, representing Wisconsin's 18th State Senate district.  The 18th Senate district then comprised Fond du Lac, Green Lake, and Waushara counties.

He resigned his Senate seat in September 1939 when he was appointed insurance commissioner for the state of Wisconsin by Governor Julius P. Heil.  He was subsequently re-appointed in 1943 by Walter Samuel Goodland, and in 1947 by Oscar Rennebohm.  He served in this office until his death.

He died at his home in Madison, Wisconsin, on August 18, 1948, following a short illness.

References

People from Fond du Lac County, Wisconsin
Republican Party Wisconsin state senators
University of Wisconsin–Oshkosh alumni
1888 births
1948 deaths
20th-century American politicians
State insurance commissioners of the United States